Red Monarch is a 1983 British television film starring Colin Blakely as Joseph Stalin. It is directed by Jack Gold and features David Suchet as Lavrentiy Beria and David Threlfall as Stalin's son Vasily.

Red Monarch is a comedy based on The Red Monarch: Scenes From the Life of Stalin, a collection of short critical essays by the Russian dissident and former KGB agent Yuri Krotkov. The film depicts Soviet politics and the interplay between Stalin and his lieutenants, particularly Beria, during the last years of Stalin's rule. The reading of Yevgeny Yevtushenko's "The Heirs of Stalin" in the final scene supposedly warns that the threat of totalitarianism is constantly present.

Cast
 Colin Blakely as Stalin
 David Suchet as Beria
 Carroll Baker as Brown
 Ian Hogg as Shaposhnikov
 David Threlfall as Vasily
 Nigel Stock as Molotov
 Lee Montague as Lee
 David Kelly as Sergo
 Glynn Edwards as Vlasek
 Peter Woodthorpe as Malenkov
 Brian Glover as Khrushchev
 Oscar Quitak as Mekhlis
 Wensley Pithey as Voroshilov
 George A. Cooper as Kaganovitch

Box office
Goldcrest Films invested £553,000 in the film and earned £292,000 making them a loss of £261,000.

References

External links
 

1983 films
British black comedy films
1980s black comedy films
Films directed by Jack Gold
Films about Joseph Stalin
Cultural depictions of Lavrentiy Beria
1983 comedy films
1980s English-language films
1980s British films
British comedy-drama television films